This is a list of electoral districts or ridings in Canada for the Canadian federal elections of 1979, 1980, and 1984.

Electoral Districts are constituencies that elect Members of Parliament in Canada's House of Commons every election.

Newfoundland - 7 seats
Bonavista—Trinity—Conception
Burin—St. George's
Gander—Twillingate
Grand Falls—White Bay—Labrador
Humber—Port au Port—St. Barbe (Humber—St. Barbe prior to 1978)
St. John's East
St. John's West

Nova Scotia - 11 seats
Annapolis Valley—Hants
Cape Breton Highlands—Canso
Cape Breton—East Richmond
Cape Breton—The Sydneys
Central Nova
Cumberland—Colchester
Dartmouth—Halifax East
Halifax
Halifax West
South Shore
South West Nova

Prince Edward Island - 4 seats
Cardigan
Egmont
Hillsborough
Malpeque

New Brunswick - 10 seats
Carleton—Charlotte
Fundy—Royal
Gloucester
Madawaska—Victoria
Moncton
Northumberland—Miramichi
Restigouche
Saint John
Westmorland—Kent
York—Sunbury

Quebec - 75 seats
Abitibi
Argenteuil (renamed Argenteuil—Papineau in 1980)
Beauce
Beauharnois—Salaberry (Beauharnois prior to 1977)
Bellechasse
Berthier—Maskinongé (renamed Berthier—Maskinongé—Lanaudière in 1980)
Blainville—Deux-Montagnes (Deux-Montagnes prior to 1977)
Bonaventure—Îles-de-la-Madeleine
Bourassa
Chambly
Champlain
Charlesbourg
Charlevoix
Châteauguay
Chicoutimi
Dollard
Drummond
Duvernay
Frontenac
Gamelin
Gaspé
Gatineau
Hochelaga—Maisonneuve (Maisonneuve prior to 1978)
Hull (renamed Hull—Aylmer in 1984)
Joliette
Jonquière
Kamouraska—Rivière-du-Loup
Labelle
Lac-Saint-Jean
Lachine
Langelier
Laprairie (renamed La Prairie in 1980)
Lasalle
Laurier
Laval (Mille-Iles prior to 1977)
Laval-des-Rapides
Lévis
Longueuil
Lotbinière
Louis-Hébert
Manicouagan
Matapédia—Matane
Mégantic—Compton—Stanstead (Compton prior to 1978)
Mercier (renamed Montreal—Mercier in 1980)
Missisquoi (renamed Brome—Missisquoi in 1983)
Montmorency (renamed Montmorency—Orléans in 1980)
Mount Royal
Notre-Dame-de-Grâce (renamed Notre-Dame-de-Grâce—Lachine East in 1980)
Outremont
Papineau
Pontiac—Gatineau—Labelle (Pontiac prior to 1978)
Portneuf
Québec-Est
Richelieu
Richmond (renamed Richmond—Wolfe in 1980)
Rimouski (renamed Rimouski—Témiscouata in 1980)
Roberval
Rosemont
Saint-Denis
Saint-Henri—Westmount (Westmount prior to 1978)
Saint-Hyacinthe (renamed Saint-Hyacinthe—Bagot in 1980)
Saint-Jacques (Saint-Henri prior to 1977)
Saint-Jean
Saint-Léonard—Anjou (Saint-Léonard prior to 1977)
Saint-Maurice
Saint-Michel (renamed Saint-Michel—Ahuntsic in 1983)
Sainte-Marie (Hochelga prior to 1978. Renamed Montreal—Sainte-Marie in 1980)
Shefford
Sherbrooke
Témiscamingue
Terrebonne
Trois-Rivières
Vaudreuil
Verchères
Verdun (renamed Verdun—Saint-Paul in 1980)

Ontario - 95 seats
Algoma
Beaches
Brampton—Georgetown (Brampton—Halton Hills prior to 1977)
Brant
Broadview—Greenwood
Bruce—Grey
Burlington
Cambridge
Cochrane (Cochrane North prior to 1977. Renamed Cochrane—Superior in 1980)
Davenport
Don Valley East
Don Valley West
Durham—Northumberland
Eglinton—Lawrence
Elgin
Erie
Essex—Kent
Essex—Windsor
Etobicoke Centre
Etobicoke North
Etobicoke—Lakeshore
Glengarry—Prescott—Russell
Grey—Simcoe
Guelph
Haldimand—Norfolk
Halton
Hamilton East
Hamilton Mountain
Hamilton West
Hamilton—Wentworth
Hastings—Frontenac (renamed Hastings—Frontenac—Lennox and Addington in 1981)
Huron—Bruce (Huron prior to 1977)
Kenora—Rainy River
Kent
Kingston and the Islands
Kitchener
Lambton—Middlesex
Lanark—Renfrew—Carleton
Leeds—Grenville
Lincoln
London East
London West
London—Middlesex (Middlesex East prior to 1977)
Mississauga North
Mississauga South
Nepean—Carleton
Niagara Falls
Nickel Belt
Nipissing
Northumberland
Ontario
Oshawa
Ottawa Centre
Ottawa West
Ottawa—Carleton
Ottawa—Vanier
Oxford
Parkdale—High Park
Parry Sound—Muskoka
Perth
Peterborough
Prince Edward—Hastings (Prince Edward prior to 1978)
Renfrew—Nipissing—Pembroke
Rosedale
Sarnia (renamed Sarnia—Lambton in 1981)
Sault Ste. Marie
Scarborough Centre
Scarborough East
Scarborough West
Simcoe North
Simcoe South
Spadina
St. Catharines
St. Paul's
Stormont—Dundas
Sudbury
Thunder Bay—Atikokan
Thunder Bay—Nipigon
Timiskaming
Timmins—Chapleau
Trinity
Victoria—Haliburton
Waterloo
Welland
Wellington—Dufferin—Simcoe (Dufferin—Wellington prior to 1977)
Windsor West
Windsor—Walkerville
York Centre
York East
York North
York South—Weston
York West
York—Peel
York—Scarborough

Manitoba - 14 seats
Brandon—Souris
Churchill
Dauphin (renamed Dauphin—Swan River in 1983)
Lisgar
Portage—Marquette
Provencher
Selkirk—Interlake
St. Boniface
Winnipeg North
Winnipeg North Centre
Winnipeg—Assiniboine
Winnipeg—Birds Hill
Winnipeg—Fort Garry
Winnipeg—St. James

Saskatchewan - 14 seats
Assiniboia
Humboldt—Lake Centre
Kindersley—Lloydminster
Mackenzie
Moose Jaw
Prince Albert
Qu'Appelle—Moose Mountain
Regina East
Regina West
Saskatoon East
Saskatoon West
Swift Current—Maple Creek
The Battlefords—Meadow Lake
Yorkton—Melville

Alberta - 21 seats
Athabasca
Bow River
Calgary Centre
Calgary East
Calgary North
Calgary South
Calgary West
Crowfoot
Edmonton East
Edmonton North
Edmonton South
Edmonton West
Edmonton—Strathcona
Lethbridge—Foothills (Lethbridge prior to 1977)
Medicine Hat
Peace River
Pembina
Red Deer
Vegreville
Wetaskiwin
Yellowhead

British Columbia - 28 seats
Burnaby
Capilano
Cariboo—Chilcotin
Comox—Powell River
Cowichan—Malahat—The Islands
Esquimalt—Saanich
Fraser Valley East
Fraser Valley West
Kamloops—Shuswap
Kootenay East—Revelstoke (Kootenay East prior to 1977)
Kootenay West
Mission—Port Moody
Nanaimo—Alberni
New Westminster—Coquitlam
North Vancouver—Burnaby
Okanagan North
Okanagan—Similkameen
Prince George—Bulkley Valley
Prince George—Peace River (Fort Nelson—Peace River prior to 1978)
Richmond—South Delta
Skeena
Surrey—White Rock—North Delta
Vancouver Centre
Vancouver East
Vancouver Kingsway
Vancouver Quadra
Vancouver South
Victoria

Northwest Territories - 2 seats
Nunatsiaq
Western Arctic

Yukon - 1 seat
Yukon

1976-1987